Watonga Regional Airport  is a city-owned, public-use airport located one nautical mile (2 km) northwest of the central business district of Watonga, a city in Blaine County, Oklahoma, United States. It is included in the National Plan of Integrated Airport Systems for 2011–2015, which categorized it as a general aviation facility.

Although most U.S. airports use the same three-letter location identifier for the FAA and IATA, this airport is assigned JWG by the FAA, but has no designation from the IATA.

Facilities and aircraft 
Watonga Regional Airport covers an area of 120 acres (49 ha) at an elevation of 1,551 feet (473 m) above mean sea level. It has one runway designated 17/35 with an asphalt surface measuring 4,001 by 60 feet (1,220 x 18 m).

For the 12-month period ending February 25, 2011, the airport had 2,900 aircraft operations, an average of 241 per month: 73% general aviation and 27% military. At that time there were 18 aircraft based at this airport, all single-engine.

References

External links 
 Watonga Regional Airport (JWG) at Oklahoma Aeronautics Commission
 Aerial image as of February 1995 from USGS The National Map
 

Airports in Oklahoma
Buildings and structures in Blaine County, Oklahoma